Christophe Clement (born November 1, 1965 in Paris, France) is a Thoroughbred horse trainer in the United States who won the 2014 Belmont Stakes with Tonalist.

Racing background 
Clement initially acquired his training skills from his father, Miguel, a leading trainer in France. Christophe later worked for the prominent French racing family of trainer Alec Head. In the United States, Christophe studied under Hall Of Fame conditioner Shug McGaughey before returning to Europe to work as assistant to trainer Luca Cumani in Newmarket, England.

Racing career 

Christophe's first winner was the first horse he saddled, Spectaculaire, at Belmont Park in 1991. Since then, he has been a prolific force in graded stakes around the country including wins with Trampoli, Danish winner of the 1994 Queen Elizabeth II stakes at Keeneland, Voodoo Dancer, Blu Tusmani, Relaxed Gesture, Flag Down, Statesmanship, Coretta, Honor Glide, Dedication, Dynever, Forbidden Apple, and England's Legend who won the Beverly D. in 2001. He had a repeat win in the 2007 Beverly D. with Royal Highness. Other highlights of 2007 were stakes winners Meribel, Gio Ponti, Revved Up, Naissance Royale, Vacare, In Summation, and Rutherienne who won six stakes, among them five graded victories.

Christophe Clement Racing Stable has yielded more than $127 million in purses in 2018, over 230 graded stakes wins, over 400 all blacktype races, and over 2,000 wins. He celebrated his 1000th win in December 2008 and his 2,000th in 2020. Clement trained Gio Ponti who won two Eclipse Awards in 2010 and 2011. In 2014, he won the Belmont Stakes and twice the Jockey Club Gold Cup with Tonalist.

Personal life 
He and his wife, Valerie, have a son, Miguel Clement, and a daughter, Charlotte Clement.

See also
 Indiantown, Florida

References
Parranda-captures-lucrative-Singapore-cup

External links 
Official site
Keeneland biography
New York Times article- 2003
New York Times article- 2014
West Point Biography
NBC Sports Article

1965 births
Living people
American horse trainers
People from Indiantown, Florida